Chiamaka Madu (born 27 July 1996) is a Nigerian professional footballer who plays for Enugu Rangers, as an offensive midfielder and supporting striker in the Nigeria Premier League. He has played for Nigeria Premier League team  known as Rivers United F.C.  formerly known as  Sharks  for three league seasons. He is such a creative strong player who create goals and also score goals

Career
Chiamaka Madu  was discovered by Karamone  started his professional football career  debut with Ocean Boys F.C. where he spent two seasons as a teenager then later joined Rivers United F.C.  formerly known as  Sharks in 2012 where he played for three football league season. He later signed for Enugu Rangers  in the  Nigeria Premier League season 2015 which he scored a goal in his debut game against Kano Pillars F.C. He was invited to the Nigeria U-20 in 2014.

He won the Nigeria Premier League season 2016 with his team Enugu Rangers.

References

External links
 Enugu Rangers  Debut Goal against Kano Pillars 2015/16
 
 Chiamaka Madu Profile in Meta Football
 Chiamaka Madu Profile in World Football

1996 births
Living people
Nigerian footballers
Footballers from Rivers State
Nigeria Professional Football League players
Association football forwards
Nigerian expatriate footballers
Expatriate footballers in Nigeria
Rangers International F.C. players
Rivers United F.C. players
Ocean Boys F.C. players
Sharks F.C. players
Karamone F.C. players
Igbo sportspeople
People from Port Harcourt